Sonia Lagarde (born 29 August 1948) is a French New Caledonian politician and the current mayor of Nouméa. She has been a member of the National Assembly for New Caledonia's 1st constituency since 2012.

Career 
Lagarde has been a member of various parties of the miscellaneous right opposed to The Rally-UMP: Une Nouvelle-Calédonie pour tous (UNCT) from 1995 to 1999, the Alliance from 1999 to 2004, Avenir ensemble from 2004 to 2008, and Caledonia Together since 2008.

Member of the Congress of New Caledonia from 1995 to 2012 and vice-president of the Assembly of the South Province from 2004 to 2011, she was elected as member of the National Assembly for New Caledonia's 1st constituency (comprising Nouméa, Isle of Pines, and the Loyalty Islands) 17 June 2012. After being the head of the municipal opposition to the majority of mayor Jean Lèques in Nouméa, she became mayor of the city following her victory in the 2014 municipal elections. In 2020, Lagarde was opposed by businessperson Cherifa Linossier in the mayoral election. Linossier was unsuccessful and Lagarde was re-elected.

References

1948 births
Living people
Mayors of Nouméa
New Caledonian people of French descent
Women members of the National Assembly (France)
Women mayors of places in France
Deputies of the 14th National Assembly of the French Fifth Republic
New Caledonian women in politics
21st-century French women politicians
Union of Democrats and Independents politicians
People from Nouméa